Miguel Ángel Jean Sanó (born May 11, 1993) is a Dominican professional baseball first baseman and third baseman who is a free agent. He previously played in Major League Baseball (MLB) for the Minnesota Twins. He made his MLB debut on July 2, 2015, and was an All-Star in 2017. Sanó has played for most of his career as a third baseman, but played more first base in 2018 and 2019, and with the Twins signing of Josh Donaldson prior to the 2020 season, was the Twins' primary first baseman.

Early life
Miguel Sanó was born in San Pedro de Macorís, Dominican Republic, to a poor Haitian family. He chose to play baseball with the name Sanó, his mother’s family name, rather than his father's, which is Jean, out of respect to the Dominican Republic. He was discovered at a young age, and worked with scouts to develop his talent. In early 2009, Major League Baseball conducted an age investigation, a prerequisite for every player signed in Latin America, that confirmed Sanó’s identity but could not verify his exact age. Sanó claimed to be 16 years old, but there had been rumors in the Dominican Republic that he was older. Twins then-general manager Bill Smith said, "Sanó’s age and identity have probably been scrutinized more than any player in the history of the Dominican Republic," and the issues and difficulties involved caused Sanó to lower his asking price from the $5–6 million bonus he was seeking when the international signing period first opened.

The Pittsburgh Pirates were the first team to offer Sanó a deal and appeared to be his most ardent suitor, but negotiations were at a standstill after agent Rob Plummer rejected a $2.6 million offer from the team and their Director of Latin American Scouting, Rene Gayo. Sanó elected to sign with the Twins over many other teams. Besides the Pirates, the Cleveland Indians also expressed interest in Sanó and even had him come to their academy in the Dominican Republic for a workout session. The Baltimore Orioles pursued Sanó for a short time, but believed his value was well below his $3 million price tag. Other interested teams included the New York Yankees and the Boston Red Sox.

On September 29, 2009, Sanó said he would sign a Major League Baseball contract with the Minnesota Twins, which included a $3.15 million signing bonus. The bonus was the largest for a Latin American player from outside of Cuba in 2009, and the second highest bonus ever for a Dominican amateur, second only to the $4.25 million the Oakland Athletics paid right-handed pitcher Michael Ynoa in 2008. It was also the highest international signing bonus in Twins history, more than the Twins spent on 70 international prospects from 2006-2008 combined. Sanó’s deal surpassed the $3 million the Yankees gave catcher Gary Sánchez. The contract was contingent upon Sanó receiving a visa from the United States, and on October 20, 2009, Sports Illustrated reported that Sanó was issued a work visa by the United States, clearing him to play professional baseball; this was confirmed by the Twins on December 5.

Sanó is one of the subjects of the 2012 documentary Ballplayer: Pelotero. The film follows Sanó through his controversial signing period in 2009. The film is directed by Jonathan Paley, Ross Finkel, and Trevor Martin, narrated by John Leguizamo, and produced by Bobby Valentine. It premiered at the Hamptons International Film Festival in 2011 and had a theatrical release in theaters in New York, Los Angeles, and Minneapolis in July 2012. The film was screened from July 13–19 in Minneapolis by the Film Society of Minneapolis/St. Paul in the St. Anthony Main Theater.

Professional career

Minor Leagues 
Before the 2011 season Baseball America rated Sanó the third-best prospect in the Twins' minor league system. Sanó spent 2011 playing third base and shortstop for the Elizabethton Twins, the Twins affiliate in the Appalachian League, hitting .292 with 20 HR and 59 RBI. After the 2011 season Baseball America rated him the top prospect in the Appalachian League, the 18th-best prospect in all of baseball, and (agreeing with Baseball Prospectus) the top Twins prospect.

Sanó spent 2012 with the Class-A Beloit Snappers of the Midwest League. He transitioned fully to third base, and general manager Terry Ryan said the team hoped to move Sanó closer to the major leagues soon. Still, his developing defense and propensity for striking out had the Twins making sure not to rush his path through the minors. Sanó hit .258 with a .373 OBP, and led the Midwest League with 28 HR and 100 RBI. After the 2012 season, Baseball America rated Sanó the second-best prospect in the Midwest League and the top Twins prospect, and Baseball Prospectus rated him the second-best Twins prospect. MLB.com rated him the 12th-best prospect in the game, as well as the top third-base prospect.

On June 9, 2013, Sanó and Eddie Rosario were promoted to the New Britain Rock Cats of the Class AA Eastern League. He compiled 35 home runs, 103 RBI, and a .280 batting average. At the end of the 2013 season, MLB.com ranked him the third-best prospect in the league, and second in the Twins organization, behind only Byron Buxton. The Twins invited Sanó to spring training in 2014. During spring training he tore his ulnar collateral ligament and required Tommy John surgery. He missed the 2014 season in recovery. Sanó began the 2015 season with the Chattanooga Lookouts of the Class AA Southern League, and batted .274 with 15 home runs and 48 RBIs through the end of June.

Minnesota Twins

2015–2016 
The Minnesota Twins promoted Sanó to the major leagues. He recorded a hit in his major league debut on July 2, 2015. Sanó played primarily as a designated hitter. He won the American League (AL) Rookie of the Month Award for August 2015, and hit 18 home runs in 80 games for the Twins for the season. He finished third in the AL Rookie of the Year Award balloting. After the 2016 season Sanó began working to become a right fielder. After being blocked from his usual position of third base and with Joe Mauer entrenched at first base, Sanó began the 2016 season as the Twins' right fielder. He was placed on the disabled list on June 1 with a strained hamstring and brought back about a month later. He finished the season at third base after Trevor Plouffe was injured, and ended his season with 25 home runs and 66 RBI despite striking out 178 times in 437 at-bats.

2017 
On April 3, 2017, Sanó hit a solo homer, drew a bases-loaded walk, and scored two runs in the Opening Day game against the Kansas City Royals. On April 22 he took exception after Matthew Boyd threw a pitch behind him. Sanó was ejected after shoving James McCann, which also sparked a benches-clearing incident. On June 29 Sanó finished runner-up to Aaron Judge in the Home Run Derby. In 114 games of 2017, Sanó finished with a .264 batting average, 28 home runs, and 78 RBI.

2018 
Sanó missed most of May 2018 due to a hamstring problem. In his first 37 games, he compiled a .203 batting average, seven home runs, and 27 RBI. On June 14 he was demoted to Class-A Advanced Fort Myers. On July 20 he was promoted to Class AAA Rochester Red Wings On July 27 he rejoined the Twins after Eduardo Escobar was traded to the Arizona Diamondbacks. By the end of the season, Sanó hit .199 with 13 home runs and 41 RBI.

2019 
In March 2019, Sanó underwent surgery on his Achilles. He returned to the lineup in May 2019. In 2019 he batted .247/.346/.576 with 34 home runs and 79 RBIs. He led the major leagues in percentage of hard-hit balls, at 57.2%.

2020 
In 2020, Sanó hit .204/.278/.478 with 13 home runs and 25 RBIs during the shortened 60-game season, leading the majors with 90 strikeouts in 186 at-bats.

2021 
In 2021, Sanó batted .223/.312/.466 with 30 home runs and 75 RBIs in 135 games. He struck out in 37.2% of his at bats against right-handers, tops in the major leagues.

2022
In 2022, Sanó batted .083 with 1 home run and 3 RBIs in 60 at bats. On May 3, it was announced that Sanó had suffered a torn meniscus in his left knee and would require meniscus surgery. On November 7, 2022, the Twins declined the option on his 2023 season, making him a free agent.

Personal life
Sanó and his wife, Daniela, had a daughter named Angelica in 2014. She died of a heart defect one week after she was born. In 2016, they had a son named Dylan Miguel.

On December 29, 2017, a Twin Cities photographer accused Sanó of sexually assaulting her in 2015 after an autograph session. Sanó denied the allegation. MLB investigated the claim and chose not to suspend him.

References

External links 

Miguel Sanó at MiLB.com

1993 births
Living people
Age controversies
American League All-Stars
Beloit Snappers players
Chattanooga Lookouts players
Dominican Republic expatriate baseball players in the United States
Dominican Republic people of Cocolo descent
Dominican Republic people of Haitian descent
Dominican Summer League Twins players
Elizabethton Twins players
Estrellas Orientales players
Fort Myers Miracle players
Gulf Coast Twins players
Major League Baseball designated hitters
Major League Baseball first basemen
Major League Baseball players from the Dominican Republic
Major League Baseball right fielders
Major League Baseball third basemen
Minnesota Twins players
New Britain Rock Cats players
Sportspeople from San Pedro de Macorís